Hamyang O clan was one of the Korean clans. Their Bon-gwan was in Hamyang County, South Gyeongsang Province. According to the research in 2015, the number of Hamyang O clan was 35846. Their founder was O Gwang-hwi who became the governor of Hamyang County in Goreyo for defeating the Khitan people.

References